Achkhoy-Martanovsky District (Theẋa-Martan khoşt) is an administrative and municipal district (raion), one of fifteen in the Chechen Republic, Russia. It is located in the west of the republic. Its administrative center is the rural locality (a selo) of Achkhoy-Martan.

Health care
State health facilities in the district are represented by one central district hospital in Achkhoy-Martan and one district hospital in Samashki.

Demographics

Population:  64,839 (2002 Census);  The population of Achkhoy-Martan accounts for 25.7% of the district's total population.

References

Notes

Sources

Districts of Chechnya
 

